William C. Gilbreath (September 9, 1851 – January 28, 1921), a.k.a. W.C. Gilbreath, was a North Dakota politician who served as the North Dakota Commissioner of Agriculture and Labor from 1905 to 1914. He was born in McMinn County, Tennessee, but his family relocated to Illinois, where he was educated in the public schools and in Wesleyan University.

He came to North Dakota and engaged in the newspaper business, and later served as deputy commissioner of insurance of the state before he was elected as Commissioner of Agriculture and Labor in 1904, as a Republican. He served in that capacity until 1914, and died in Bismarck in 1921 at the age of 69.

Bibliography
 North Dakota Secretary of State. "North Dakota Blue Book" (1911), pp. 527.

See also
List of North Dakota Commissioners of Agriculture and Labor

Notes 

1851 births
1921 deaths
Wesleyan University alumni
North Dakota Commissioners of Agriculture and Labor
People from McMinn County, Tennessee
People from Illinois